Karolina Adamczyk (born 1975) is a Polish actress.

She won the Pomeranian Artistic Award (Pomorska Nagroda Artystyczna) in 2000.

Filmography 
2002-2008: Samo życie
2004-2008: Pierwsza miłość
2005: M jak miłość
2005-2006: Plebania
2005: We're All Christs
2006: Egzamin z życia
2006: Fałszerze – powrót Sfory
2008: Rubinowe gody
2008: Wydział zabójstw
2012: True Law

External links 
Karolina Adamczyk at filmpolski.pl

Living people
Polish actresses
1975 births
21st-century Polish actresses